The Petroleum (Production) Act 1934 (24 & 25 Geo. 5 ch. 36) is an Act of the Parliament of the United Kingdom which clarified the ownership of underground petroleum, vesting it in the Crown. It made provision for searching and boring for and getting (producing) petroleum and natural gas, under appropriate licenses.

Background 
Before 1934 there was a lack of clarity about the ownership of oil beneath a property. For example, in 1919 the Attorney-General was asked in Parliament whether the surface owner also owned the oil beneath their land. The Attorney-General acknowledged that opinions differed, but was inclined to the view that the surface owner is the owner of oil beneath the land. The 1934 Act clarified the position and vested underground oil in the Crown.

The Petroleum (Production) Act 1918 had required persons wishing to prospect for oil to obtain a license from the Board of Trade. However between 1918 and 1934 only seven licenses were issued and by 1934 only three were in force. Furthermore, oil prices were generally falling during the 1920s thereby discouraging exploration.

The Petroleum Act 1934 
The Petroleum (Production) Act 1934 (24 & 25 Geo. 5 ch. 36) received Royal Assent on 12 July 1934. Its long title is: ‘An Act to vest in the Crown the property in petroleum and natural gas within Great Britain and to make provision with respect to the searching and boring for and getting of petroleum and natural gas, and for purposes connected with the matters aforesaid.’

Provisions 
The Act comprises 11 Sections and a Schedule:

 Section 1. Vesting petroleum in the Crown
 Section 2. Licenses to search for and get petroleum
 Section 3. Compulsory rights to enter land
 Section 4. Supply of natural gas
 Section 5. Accounting for receipts and expenditure
 Section 6. Power to make regulations
 Section 7. Power to inspect plans of mines
 Section 8. Powers and duties of the Board of Trade
 Section 9. Definition of minerals
 Section 10. Savings
 Section 11. Short title, repeal and extent
 Schedule

Effects of the act 
The Act vested ownership of petroleum in its natural condition in underground strata in the Crown. The Board of Trade was empowered to issue licenses to persons to search for, bore and produce petroleum. Natural gas could be supplied to premises by license holders. The Board of Trade was empowered to make Regulations specifying how to apply for a license, the fees payable, the size and shape of the permitted area of license, and model clauses. The Board of Trade was empowered to inspect the position of mine workings. The Petroleum (Production) Act 1918 (8 & 9 Geo. 5 c.52) was repealed.

The 1934 Act was seen as a sensible measure: encouraging exploration, but through licensing, preventing wildcat drilling.

The Act (Section 6) gave the Minister power to make regulations. The following year the Petroleum (Production) Regulations 1935 were published and contained Model Clauses which were incorporated into licences.

In 1959 Shell applied to the Ministry of Power for a licence to explore for gas in the North Sea. The company asked whether the Petroleum (Production) Act 1934, could be extended beyond territorial waters to areas of the North Sea which would fall within the jurisdiction of the British Government. The view of the Ministry was that licences could not be issued until legislation was enacted.

Later enactments 
The 1934 Act was repealed by Section 51 of the Petroleum Act 1998 (1998  c. 17).

See also 
 Oil and gas industry in the United Kingdom
Petroleum Act

References 

United Kingdom Acts of Parliament 1934
History of the petroleum industry in the United Kingdom